National Economics University (NEU) is a public research university in Hanoi, Vietnam. Founded in 1956, its history and influence have made it one of the leading universities in Economics, Public Administration and Business Administration in Vietnam.

NEU is now chairing a network of more than 40 universities in Vietnam in economics and business administration. It is also a prestigious research and consultation center with its publications and consulting works to the government of Vietnam on policy making and to the business community on business development.

Since its establishment, NEU has paid special attention to developing international academic cooperation. It has formed partnership relationship with over 100 institutions and organizations from 30 countries, including Australia, Belgium, Cambodia, Canada, China, France, Germany, Japan, Laos, Netherlands, South Korea, Taiwan, the United Kingdom, and the United States. The university has been involved in research projects in cooperation with large governmental organizations and international financial institutions such as the Japanese International Cooperation Agency (JICA), the Foundation of Vietnam Development Forum (VDF), the National Graduate Institute for Policy Studies (GRIPS), the World Bank (WB), the Asian Development Bank (ADB), the Department for International Development (DFID - UK), and Ausaid (Australia).

Many of the university's alumni have a strong track record of success and hold important positions in public and private sectors. The current President of Vietnam, Nguyễn Xuân Phúc, is an alumni.

History
In 1956, the university was established by the government decree, originally named Central School of Economics and Finance.

In 1958, the school changed its name to University of Economics and Finance, under the supervision of Ministry of Education.

In 1962, Prime Minister Phạm Văn Đồng signed a decree to separate the Faculty of International Relations from the University of Economics and Finance and establish a new university called University of Foreign Affairs and Foreign Trade, under the supervision of Ministry of Foreign Affairs. This later led to the foundation of two reputable institutions, Foreign Trade University, and Diplomatic Academy of Vietnam.

In 1965, the name was changed to University of Economic Planning.

In 1985, it was renamed National Economics University. It has kept this name since then.

For more than 60 years, the university has received numerous prestigious awards from the Vietnamese and Lao governments. More than 100,000 Bachelor's students, 10,000 Master's students, and 1,400 PhD students graduated from the university.

Schools and Faculties

Presidents

 Phạm Văn Đồng (Honorary President)
 Nguyễn Văn Tạo: 1956-1960
 Đoàn Trọng Truyến: 1960-1963
 Hồ Ngọc Nhường: 1963-1968
 Prof. Đỗ Khiêm: 1968-1970
 Prof. Mai Hữu Khuê: 1970-1982
 Phạm Hữu Niên: 1982-1984
 Dr. Sc. Lê Văn Toàn: 1984-1985
 Prof. Nguyễn Pháp: 1985-1987
 Prof. Vũ Đình Bách: 1987-1994
 Prof. Lương Xuân Quỳ: 1994-1999
 Prof. Nguyễn Đình Hương: 1999-2002
 Prof. Lê Du Phong: 2002-2003
 Prof. Nguyễn Văn Thường: 2003-2008
 Prof. Nguyễn Văn Nam: 2008-2013
 Assoc. Prof. Phạm Mạnh Hùng: 2013-2014
 Prof. Trần Thọ Đạt: 2014-2018
Assoc. Prof. Phạm Hồng Chương: 2019-

Notable alumni

Nguyễn Xuân Phúc - 10th President, former Prime Minister of Vietnam
Đặng Phong - Vietnamese Economic Historian
Ngô Văn Dụ - Member of the Politburo of the CPV, Secretary of the Central Committee of the CPV, Chairman of the Central Inspection Commission of the CPV
 Lê Hữu Nghĩa - Director of Ho Chi Minh National Academy of Politics
 Nguyễn Đức Kiên - Vice Chairman of National Assembly of Vietnam
 Đỗ Hoài Nam - Chairman of Vietnam Academy of Social Sciences
 Somphao Phaysith - Member of the Central Committee of the Lao People's Revolutionary Party, Governor of the Bank of the Lao P.D.R
 Nguyễn Hòa Bình - Chairman of Vietcombank
Phan Đăng Tuất - Head of Department of Enterprise Renovation and Development, Ministry of Industry and Trade of Vietnam, Chairman of Sabeco
 Nguyễn Thị Nga - Chairman of SeABank, Chairman of BRG Group
Thái Hương - Vice Chairman & CEO of Bac A Bank, Founder & Advisor of TH Food Chain JSC
 Vũ Văn Tiền - Chairman of An Binh Bank, Former Chairman of Geleximco Group
 Dương Công Minh - Chairman of Sacombank
 Trần Đình Long - Chairman of Hoa Phat Group
 Nguyễn Đình Thắng - Chairman of LienViet Postbank
 Nguyễn Mạnh Hùng - Vietnamese Minister of Information and Communications, Chairman & CEO of Viettel
 Hồ Đức Phớc - Head of State Audit Office of Vietnam
 Hồ Lê Nghĩa - Chairman of Vinataba
 Nguyễn Thanh Phượng - Chairman of Viet Capital Bank
 Trương Đình Anh - Board Member & CEO of FPT Corporation, CEO of FPT Telecom
 Chu Thị Thanh Hà - Chairman of FPT Software
 Trần Xuân Kiên - Founder & CEO of Tran Anh Digital World JSC
 Phạm Duy Hiếu - CEO of Startup Vietnam Foundation, CEO of An Binh Bank
 Đỗ Thị Hà - Miss Vietnam 2020
 Bùi Phương Nga - 1st Runner-Up Miss Vietnam 2018
 Nông Thúy Hằng - Miss Ethnic Vietnam 2022

References

External links
 
 

Universities in Hanoi
1956 establishments in North Vietnam